"Deep" is a song recorded by American industrial rock band Nine Inch Nails for the soundtrack to the film Lara Croft: Tomb Raider (2001). Because this is a promotional single, it has never been featured with its own official halo and the song "Deep" has never been released on any Nine Inch Nails album, or on any halo-numbered release, although it has its own video directed by Enda McCallion.

Music video

Despite its only release on the soundtrack for Lara Croft: Tomb Raider, the music video for "Deep" is completely unrelated to the film. The video features Trent Reznor as a bank robber who, together with a woman, steals two boxes from the national mint. They believe these boxes contain cash, but instead contain a highly toxic dye, which sprays all over them when they (separately) attempt to open the boxes. Rushing to warn each other, their cars collide head on. The narrative occurs in reverse order during the video, with the car accident at the beginning and the decision by the thieves to retrieve the boxes (to "make a withdrawal") at the end.

Reznor has made it clear in numerous interviews that he was disappointed by how the video turned out.

Track listing
US promotional CD single
"Deep" (radio edit) – 3:35
"Deep" (album version) – 4:06

Charts

References

2001 songs
Nine Inch Nails songs
Song recordings produced by Alan Moulder
Song recordings produced by Trent Reznor
Songs written for films
Songs written by Trent Reznor